Justin Tipuric (born 6 August 1989) is a Welsh international rugby union player who plays for Wales as an openside flanker.

Early life
Tipuric is of Croatian descent. He grew up in Trebanos after initially being born in the village of Alltwen.

Club career
Tipuric plays for the Ospreys Welsh regional team, having previously played for Aberavon RFC. His Ospreys debut came as a replacement in an LV= Cup home defeat to Northampton Saints on 5 November 2009, and he has now played more than 170 times for his home region, including starting in the 2012 Magners League title win over Leinster in Dublin in May, 2012. He was made Ospreys captain for the 2018/19 season.

International career
In June 2011 he was named in the Wales national rugby union team 45-man training squad for the 2011 Rugby World Cup, but was ultimately left out of the final squad. He made his Wales international debut on 20 August 2011 versus Argentina as a second-half replacement. He was also included in the Wales Rugby Sevens in 10/11.

After his efforts for the Welsh side in the 2013 Six Nations Championship, he was selected by Warren Gatland for the 2013 British & Irish Lions tour to Australia.

In August 2015 Tipuric named to the Welsh national rugby union team 47-man training squad for 2015 Rugby World Cup, and started in the home & away warm-up fixtures against Ireland, scoring tries in both fixtures (the first was nominated for World Rugby Try of the Year) and being named man of the match in the second game. Tipuric was named to the final 31-man squad, and despite his fantastic form entering the tournament, he was dropped from the starting XV in favour of returning captain Sam Warburton. He did however feature in all 5 of Wales' games scoring a try in the win 54–9 against Uruguay, his third successive international with a try.

After being named in the squad for the 2016 Six Nations Championship, Tipuric went on to feature in all 5 games, starting alongside longtime rival Sam Warburton against Ireland & Scotland. In the final game against Italy, Tipuric sustained a heavy concussion during a line out which resulted in Tipuric requiring a three-month break from the sport to recover, ruling him out of the summer tour to New Zealand. Following his return from injury Tipuric was included Robert Howley's squad for the 2016 end-of-year rugby union internationals, going onto start in 3 fixtures including a man of the match try scoring performance versus South Africa.

Tipuric was named in the squad for the 2017 Six Nations Championship, and started in the first fixture versus Italy.

International tries

References

External links

 How wrestling matches with a prisoner of war made Justin Tipuric
 
 Wales Profile 
 Justin Tipuric nominated for World Rugby try of the year award
 Wales’ Justin Tipuric given three month concussion layoff

1989 births
Living people
Aberavon RFC players
British & Irish Lions rugby union players from Wales
Ospreys (rugby union) players
Rugby union flankers
Rugby union players from Trebanos
Wales international rugby union players
Welsh people of Croatian descent
Welsh rugby union players